Mbwana Ally Samatta (born 23 December 1992) is a Tanzanian professional footballer who plays as a striker for Belgian Pro League club Genk, on loan from Süper Lig club Fenerbahçe, and captains the Tanzania national team.

Samatta began his career as a youth player for Tanzanian club African Lyon in 2008. He turned professional in 2010 with Simba Sports Club, where he played for only half of the season before moving to TP Mazembe, spending a total of five years with them, initially becoming a first-team regular. He was named the 2015 African based Player of the Year and finished the season as the top goalscorer of the CAF Champions League, as he helped TP Mazembe to win the title.

In January 2016, Samatta signed for Belgian side K.R.C. Genk, helping them to qualify for the UEFA Europa League and win the Belgian Jupiler League in 2019. Having finished the season as the top goalscorer of the Jupiler League, he also won the Ebony Shoe award in Belgium for his outstanding season with Genk.

In January 2020, he moved to Aston Villa, becoming the first Tanzania-born player to play and score in the Premier League.

Club career
Samatta was a key figure during TP Mazembe's run to the final of the 2015 CAF Champions League, scoring seven goals in the process and finishing as the competition's top scorer. In their group stage match against Moghreb Tétouan, Samatta scored a memorable hat-trick to secure a place in the semi-finals where they were drawn against Sudanese side Al-Merrikh SC. Mazembe would go on to lift the cup after defeating Algerian side USM Alger in the final 4–1 on aggregate, with Samatta scoring a goal in both legs.

At the Glo-CAF Awards on 7 January 2016 at the International Conference Centre in Abuja, Nigeria, he became the first player from East Africa to be crowned the CAF African Player of the Year. Mbwana garnered a total of 127 points, ahead of his TP Mazembe teammate and DR Congo goalkeeper Robert Kidiaba, who amassed 88 points, and Algerian Baghdad Bounedjah trailed in third place with 63 points.

Genk
In January 2016, after winning the prize for best African player on the continent, he signed a four-and-a-half-year contract with KRC Genk. He was voted the 2017 Most Influential Young Tanzanian in a ranking poll by Avance Media

On 23 August 2018, Samatta scored a hat-trick against Brøndby IF in the Europa League for a 5–2 win.

During the 2018–19 season, he led the Belgian First Division A in scoring with 20 goals, as Genk finished the season as league winners. In May 2019 he was awarded with the Ebony Shoe award for his exploits during the campaign.

Aston Villa
On 20 January 2020, Samatta signed a four-and-a-half-year contract with Premier League club Aston Villa. In doing so, he became the first Tanzanian to sign for a Premier League club, and is the 117th different nationality to play in the competition. The transfer fee paid to Genk was reported as £8.5 million. Samatta made his debut for the club 8 days later in Villa's 2–1 EFL Cup semi-final second-leg win over Leicester City, a result which sealed the club's place in the final of the competition.

On 1 February 2020, Samatta scored on his league debut for Aston Villa, in a 2–1 defeat to Bournemouth. This made him the first player from Tanzania to play, and subsequently score in the Premier League.

Fenerbahçe 
On 25 September 2020, Samatta joined Süper Lig club Fenerbahçe S.K. on an initial loan deal until the end of the season. As part of the deal, Samatta signed a four-year contract at the end of his loan spell in July 2021. 

On 1 September 2021, Samatta joined Belgian side Royal Antwerp on a season-long loan.

On 16 August 2022, Samatta returned to Genk on loan, with an option to buy.

Personal life
Samatta is a Muslim. He made the umrah to Mecca in 2018 with his Genk teammate Omar Colley.

Career statistics

Club

International

Scores and results list Tanzania's goal tally first, score column indicates score after each Samatta goal.

Honours
TP Mazembe
 Linafoot: 2011, 2012, 2013, 2013–14
 DR Congo Super Cup: 2013, 2014
 CAF Champions League: 2015

Genk
 Belgian Pro League: 2018–19
 Belgian Super Cup: 2019

Aston Villa
EFL Cup runner-up: 2019–20

Individual
 African Inter-Club Player of the Year: 2015
 CAF Team of the Year: 2015
 CAF Champions League top scorer: 2015
 Ebony Shoe: 2019
 Belgian First Division A Golden Shoe: 2018–19

References

External links

1992 births
Living people
People from Dar es Salaam
Tanzanian Muslims
Tanzanian footballers
Association football forwards
African Lyon F.C. players
Simba S.C. players
TP Mazembe players
K.R.C. Genk players
Aston Villa F.C. players
Fenerbahçe S.K. footballers
Royal Antwerp F.C. players
Tanzanian Premier League players
Linafoot players
Belgian Pro League players
Premier League players
Süper Lig players
Tanzania international footballers
2019 Africa Cup of Nations players
Tanzanian expatriate footballers
Tanzanian expatriate sportspeople in the Democratic Republic of the Congo
Tanzanian expatriate sportspeople in Belgium
Tanzanian expatriate sportspeople in England
Tanzanian expatriate sportspeople in Turkey
Expatriate footballers in the Democratic Republic of the Congo
Expatriate footballers in Belgium
Expatriate footballers in England
Expatriate footballers in Turkey